David Archibald (September 20, 1717 – 1795) was an Irish-born farmer and politician in Nova Scotia. He represented Truro Township in the Legislative Assembly of Nova Scotia from 1766 to 1770.

He was born in Derry and came to Londonderry, New Hampshire in 1757. In 1762, Archibald settled in Truro Township. He had married Elizabeth Elliott in 1741. Archibald was a justice of the peace and a major in the local militia. He was elected to the assembly in a 1766 by-election held after Charles Morris, Jr, who had been elected in both Truro and King's County, chose to represent the latter. Archibald died at Bible Hill.

His son Samuel, his grandson Samuel George William Archibald and his great-grandson Charles Dickson Archibald also served in the assembly.

References 
 

1717 births
1795 deaths
Nova Scotia pre-Confederation MLAs
Kingdom of Ireland emigrants to the Thirteen Colonies